The 1908 Yale Bulldogs football team represented Yale University in the 1908 college football season. The Bulldogs finished with a 7–1–1 record under first-year head coach Lucius Horatio Biglow.

Three Yale players, fullback Ted Coy and guards Hamlin Andrus and William Goebel, were consensus picks for the 1908 College Football All-America Team.

Schedule

References

Yale
Yale Bulldogs football seasons
Yale Bulldogs football